Vatica diospyroides is a species of plant in the family Dipterocarpaceae. It is a tree found in Malaysia, Thailand, and Vietnam. It is a critically endangered species threatened by habitat loss.

References

diospyroides
Trees of Peninsular Malaysia
Trees of Thailand
Trees of Vietnam
Critically endangered flora of Asia
Taxonomy articles created by Polbot